George Cornetta (January 12, 1894 – May 12, 1967) was an American long-distance runner. He competed in the men's 10,000 metres at the 1920 Summer Olympics.

References

External links
 

1894 births
1967 deaths
Athletes (track and field) at the 1920 Summer Olympics
American male long-distance runners
Olympic track and field athletes of the United States
Place of birth missing
20th-century American people